Crawford/West was an American country music duo consisting of Rick Crawford (from Texas) and Kenny West (from Arkansas). Signed to Warner Bros. Records, they released their first single, "Summertime Girls," in May 1997. The song peaked at No. 75 on the Billboard Hot Country Singles & Tracks chart in the United States and No. 91 on the RPM Country Tracks chart in Canada. A second single, "Healing End," was released in June 1998, but failed to chart. Two months later, the duo requested to be released from their recording contract with Warner Bros.

Discography

Singles

Music videos

References

External links
[ allmusic ((( Rick Crawford > Overview )))]
[ allmusic ((( Kenny West > Overview )))]

American country music groups
Country music duos
Musical groups established in 1997